Sauli Sinkkonen (born 14 September 1989) is a Finnish male volleyball player. He is part of the Finland men's national volleyball team. On club level he plays for Saaremaa.

References

External links
 Profile at FIVB.org

1989 births
Living people
People from Sastamala
Finnish men's volleyball players
Finnish expatriates in Belgium
Expatriate volleyball players in Belgium
Expatriate volleyball players in Estonia
Finnish expatriates in Estonia
Finnish expatriates in France
Expatriate volleyball players in France
Finnish expatriates in Romania
Expatriate volleyball players in Romania
Sportspeople from Pirkanmaa